In computer science, more specifically in automata and formal language theory, nested words are a concept proposed by Alur and Madhusudan as a joint generalization of words, as traditionally used for modelling linearly ordered structures, and of ordered unranked trees, as traditionally used for modelling hierarchical structures. Finite-state acceptors for nested words,
so-called nested word automata, then give a more expressive generalization of finite automata on words. The linear encodings of languages accepted by finite nested word automata gives the class of visibly pushdown languages. The latter language class lies properly between the regular languages and the deterministic context-free languages. Since their introduction in 2004, these concepts have triggered much research in that area.

Formal definition
To define nested words, first define matching relations. For a nonnegative integer , the notation  denotes the set , with the special case .

A matching relation ↝ of length  is a subset of  such that:
 all nesting edges are forward, that is, if  then ; 
A position i is referred to as 
 a call position, if i ↝ j for some j, 
 a pending call if i ↝ ∞, 
 a return position, if h ↝ i for some h, 
 a pending return if −∞ ↝ i, and
 an internal position in all remaining cases.

A nested word of length   over an alphabet Σ is a pair (w,↝), where w is a word, or string, of length  over Σ and ↝ is a matching relation of length .

Encoding nested words into ordinary words
Nested words over the alphabet  can be encoded into "ordinary" words over the tagged alphabet , in which each symbol a from Σ has three tagged counterparts: the
symbol ⟨a for encoding a call position in a nested word labelled with a, the symbol a⟩ for encoding a return position labelled with a, and finally the symbol a itself for representing an internal position labelled with a. More precisely, let φ be the function mapping nested words over Σ to words over  such that each nested word (↝) is mapped to the word , where the letter  equals ⟨a, a, and a⟩, if  and i is a (possibly pending) call position, an internal position, and a (possibly pending) return position, respectively.

Example

Automata

Nested word automaton
A nested word automaton has a finite number of states, and operates in almost the same way as a deterministic finite automaton on classical strings: a classical finite automaton reads the input word  from left to right, and the state of the automaton after reading the jth letter  depends on the state in which the automaton was before reading .

In a nested word automaton, the position  in the nested word (w,↝) might be a return position; if so, the state after reading  will not only depend on the linear state in which the automaton was before reading , but also on a hierarchical state propagated by the automaton at the time it was in the corresponding call position. In analogy to regular languages of words, a set  L of nested words is called regular if it is accepted by some (finite-state) nested word automaton.

Visibly pushdown automaton
Nested word automata are an automaton model accepting nested words. There is an equivalent automaton model operating on (ordinary) words. Namely, the notion of a deterministic visibly pushdown automaton is a restriction of the notion of a deterministic pushdown automaton.

Following Alur and Madhusudan, a deterministic visibly pushdown automaton is formally defined as a 6-tuple 
where
 is a finite set of states,
The alphabet  denotes the set of call symbols,  contains the return symbols, and the set  contains the internal symbols,
 is a finite set which is called the stack alphabet, containing a special symbol  denoting the empty stack,
 is the transition function, which is partitioned into three parts corresponding to call transitions, return transitions, and internal transitions, namely
, the call transition function
, the return transition function
, the internal transition function,
 is the initial state, and
 is the set of accepting states.

The notion of computation of a visibly pushdown automaton is a restriction of the one used for pushdown automata. Visibly pushdown automata only add a symbol to the stack when reading a call symbol , they only remove the top element from the stack when reading a return symbol  and they do not alter the stack when reading an internal event . A computation ending in an accepting state is an accepting computation.

As a result, a visibly pushdown automaton cannot push to and pop from the stack with the same input symbol.

If a language  over a tagged alphabet  is accepted by a deterministic visibly pushdown automaton, then  is called a visibly pushdown language.

Nondeterministic visibly pushdown automata
Nondeterministic visibly pushdown automata are as expressive as deterministic ones. Hence one can transform a nondeterministic visibly pushdown automaton into a deterministic one, but if the nondeterministic automaton had  states, the deterministic one may have up to  states.

Decision problems
Let  be the size of the description of an automaton , then it is possible to check if a word n is accepted by the automaton in time . In particular, the emptiness problem is solvable in time .
If  is fixed, it is decidable in time  and space  where  is the depth of n in a streaming seeing. It is also decidable with space  and time , and by a uniform boolean circuit of depth .

For two nondeterministic automata A and B, deciding whether the set of words accepted by A is a subset of the word accepted by B is EXPTIME-complete. It is also EXPTIME-complete to figure out if there is a word that is not accepted.

Languages
In particular, the function that removes the matching relation from nested words transforms regular languages over nested words into context-free languages.

Closure properties
The set of visibly pushdown languages is closed under the following operations: 
set operations:
union
intersection
complement, 
thus giving rise to a boolean algebra.
Kleene star
concatenation
 reversal 
String homomorphism 

If  is in state  on reading a call symbol , then
 pushes the stack symbol 
and goes to state , where  is the stack symbol pushed by 

If  is in state  on reading an internal symbol , then 
goes to state , whenever 

If  is in state  on reading a return symbol , then 
pops the symbol  from the stack and
goes to state , where  is the stack symbol popped by 

Correctness of the above construction crucially relies on the fact that the push and pop actions of the simulated
In fact, a similar simulation is no longer possible for deterministic pushdown automata, as the larger class of deterministic context-free languages is no longer closed under intersection.

In contrast to the construction for concatenation shown above, the complementation construction for visibly pushdown automata parallels the standard construction for deterministic pushdown automata.

Moreover, like the class of context free languages the class of visibly pushdown languages is closed under prefix closure and reversal, hence also suffix closure.

Relation to other language classes
In comparison to conjunctive grammars, a generalization of context-free grammars,  shows that the linear conjunctive languages form a superclass of the visibly pushdown languages. The table at the end of this article puts the family of visibly pushdown languages in relation to other language families in the Chomsky hierarchy.
Rajeev Alur and Parthasarathy Madhusudan related a subclass of regular binary tree languages to visibly pushdown languages.

Other models of description

Visibly pushdown grammars
Visibly pushdown languages are exactly the languages that can be described by visibly pushdown grammars.

Visibly pushdown grammars can be defined as a restriction of context-free grammars. A visibly pushdown grammar G is defined by the 4-tuple:

 where
Each variable represents a different type of phrase or clause in the sentence.
The set of terminals is the alphabet of the language defined by the grammar .
There are three kinds of rewrite rules. For ,  and 

 and if  then  and 
 and if  then 
 is the start variable (or start symbol), used to represent the whole sentence (or program).

Uniform Boolean circuits
The problem whether a word of length  is accepted by a given nested word automaton can be solved by uniform boolean circuits of depth .

Logical description
Regular languages over nested words are exactly the set of languages described by monadic second-order logic with two unary predicates call and return, linear successor and the matching relation ↝.

See also
Model checking

Notes

References

Okhotin, Alexander: Comparing linear conjunctive languages to subfamilies of the context-free languages, 37th International Conference on Current Trends in Theory and Practice of Computer Science (SOFSEM 2011).

External links
 Nested words and visibly pushdown languages
 Visibly pushdown automata – Automata on nested words
 class VPL at the Complexity Zoo

Words
Formal languages
Automata (computation)